Elmore James was an American blues slide guitarist and singer who recorded from 1951 until 1963.  His most famous song, "Dust My Broom", an electrified adaptation of a Robert Johnson tune, was his first hit and features one of the most identifiable slide guitar figures in blues.  James' composition "The Sky Is Crying" (which became a blues standard) and his rendition of "It Hurts Me Too" were among his most successful singles on the record charts.  Other popular James' songs, such as "I Can't Hold Out", ""Madison Blues", "Shake Your Moneymaker", "Bleeding Heart", and "One Way Out", have been recorded by several other artists, including Fleetwood Mac, Jimi Hendrix, and the Allman Brothers Band.

As with most blues artists in the 1950s and early 1960s, James' recordings were originally issued on two-song record singles. "Dust My Broom" was first issued by the small Trumpet Records label in 1951. Shortly thereafter, James began recording for several larger companies. From 1952 to 1956, he recorded for the Bihari brothers, who issued singles on their Meteor, Flair, and Modern labels.  In 1957, he recorded for Mel London's Chief Records and from 1959 to 1963, for Bobby Robinson's Fire Records.  In 1953 and again in 1960, James also recorded some songs that appeared on Checker/Chess Records. He also played guitar on several recordings by other artists, including J. T. Brown, Big Joe Turner, Little Johnny Jones, and Junior Wells.

In 1960, the Biharis released the compilation, Blues After Hours, on their budget Crown label, which was the only album released during James' career.  After his death in 1963, his former companies began re-issuing a number of his singles on subsidiaries and leasing them out to other companies.  These various labels also began releasing numerous compilation albums, often with significant overlap in song selection.  With the advent of compact discs, this trend continued.  However, some box sets have appeared that collect most or all of James' recordings for a particular label or time period.  The Chess, Capricorn, and Virgin America/Flair collections also include some previously unreleased material and alternate takes.

Releases 1951–1963
On record releases, Elmore James is sometimes listed as "Elmo James", "Elmore James and the Broomdusters", and "Elmore James and His Broomdusters".

Singles

Compilation albums
Only one album by Elmore James was released during his lifetime.  The compilation album, titled Blues After Hours, was issued by the Bihari budget Crown label in 1960.  In 1960, Fire Records planned a second compilation album featuring 1959–1960 singles, but did not issue it.  A compilation with a similar track listing was released in 1965, titled The Sky Is Crying (see below).

Posthumous releases (after 1963)

Singles

Selected compilation albums
Numerous Elmore James compilation albums issued by a number of record companies have been released over the years.  The following lists some of the more notable and current releases, including box sets:
{| class="wikitable sortable plainrowheaders"
|+ 
! scope="col" width=5% | Year
! scope="col" width=42% | Title
! scope="col" width=30% class="unsortable" | Notes
! scope="col" width=15% | Label
! scope="col" class="unsortable" | 
|-
| 1965
! scope="row" | The Sky Is Crying
| 12 Fire/Fury Records/Enjoy tracks
| Sphere Sound SSR 7002
| 
|-
| 1969
! scope="row" | Whose Muddy Shoes
| All Checker/Chess recordings; also includes songs by John Brim
| Chess 1537
| 
|-
| 1975
! scope="row" | ''Street Talkin| All Chief recordings; also includes songs by Eddie Taylor
| Muse MCD 5087
| 
|-
| 1992
! scope="row" | Elmore James: King of the Slide Guitar
| All Fire/Fury/Enjoy recordings
| Capricorn 9 42006–2
| 
|-
| rowspan="2" | 1993
! scope="row" | Elmore James: The Classic Early Records 1951–1956
| All Meteor/Flair/Modern recordings
| Virgin America/Flair 7243 8 39632 2 5
| 
|-
! scope="row" | The Sky Is Crying: The History of Elmore James
| 21 tracks from various labels
| Rhino R2 71190
| 
|-
| 1995
! scope="row" | The Best of Elmore James: The Early Years
| 28 Meteor/Flair/Modern tracks
| Ace CDCHD 583
| 
|-
| 2001
! scope="row" | Shake Your Money Maker: The Best of the Fire Sessions
| 16 Fire/Fury/Enjoy tracks
| Buddha 99781
| 
|-
|}

Elmore James as an accompanist
Although it is documented that Elmore James performed with Sonny Boy Williamson II, it is unclear which, if any, of Williamson's early recordings include James as a sideman. It is unknown if James performed on additional recordings by Big Joe Turner and Junior Wells.

Singles

Record charts

Notes FootnotesCitationsReferences'''

Discographies of American artists
Blues discographies